San Pietro in Lama is a town and comune in the   province of Lecce in the Apulia region of south-east Italy.

Its Mother Church is a typical example of Leccese Baroque.

References

Cities and towns in Apulia
Localities of Salento